Soisy-Bouy is a commune in the Seine-et-Marne department in the Île-de-France region in north-central France.

History
On 16 November 1240, Edmund Rich (1175–1240), also known as Saint Edmund or Eadmund of Canterbury, and as Saint Edmund of Abingdon, a 13th-century archbishop of Canterbury in England, died here at the house of Augustinian Canons.

Demographics
Inhabitants of Soisy-Bouy are called Bouyards.

See also
Communes of the Seine-et-Marne department

References

External links

1999 Land Use, from IAURIF (Institute for Urban Planning and Development of the Paris-Île-de-France région) 

Communes of Seine-et-Marne